Robert Stroshine is an American para-alpine skier. He represented the United States at the 1988 Winter Paralympics in alpine skiing.

He won the bronze medal in the Men's Downhill LW9 event and the bronze medal in the Men's Giant Slalom LW9 event.

He also competed in the Men's Slalom LW9 event and finished in 4th place.

References 

Living people
Year of birth missing (living people)
Place of birth missing (living people)
Paralympic alpine skiers of the United States
American male alpine skiers
Alpine skiers at the 1988 Winter Paralympics
Medalists at the 1988 Winter Paralympics
Paralympic bronze medalists for the United States
Paralympic medalists in alpine skiing